Eudonia nakajimai is a moth in the family Crambidae. It was described by Sasaki in 2002. It is found in Japan.

References

Moths described in 2002
Eudonia